Misina is a peak in the Mecsek mountain range in Baranya county, Hungary. Its elevation is 535 metres above sea level.
On the peak stands the 197-metre-high Pécs TV Tower finished in 1973. Misina also hosts a simple ski piste.

References

Mountains of Hungary